Dasyochloa is a monotypic genus containing the single species Dasyochloa pulchella (formerly Erioneuron pulchellum), known as desert fluff-grass or low woollygrass, a densely tufted perennial grass found in the deserts of the southwestern United States.

Range and habitat
It is native to the Southwestern United States,  California, and northern to central Mexico, where it grows in dry regions such as deserts.

Growth pattern
It is a perennial bunchgrass forming small tufts just a few centimeters high with clumps of short, sharp-pointed leaves. The tufts are often enveloped in masses of cottony fibers; these are actually hairlike strands of excreted and evaporated mineral salts.

Stems and leaves
The leaves produce soft, cob-webby hairs that dissolve in water, after summer rains. The hairs are typically not present in spring.

Inflorescence
The hairy inflorescence is a spikelet on the end of the stem, surrounded by a bundle of bractlike leaves, and is 1/4" to 1/2" long. The spikelets which are pale in color, sometimes striped with red, purple, or green. It blooms from February to May.

References

External links
 Jepson Manual Treatment
 USDA Plants Profile
 Photo gallery

Chloridoideae
Monotypic Poaceae genera
Bunchgrasses of North America
Grasses of Mexico
Grasses of the United States
Native grasses of California
Flora of the California desert regions
Flora of the Sonoran Deserts
Flora of the Chihuahuan Desert
Flora of Northwestern Mexico
Flora without expected TNC conservation status